was an old province in Japan in what is today Nemuro Subprefecture, Hokkaidō.  It was created during the Meiji Era.

History
After 1869, the northern Japanese island was known as Hokkaido; and regional administrative subdivisions were identified, including Nemuro Province.
August 15, 1869 Nemuro Province created with five districts
1872 Population is 832.
January 1885 Shikotan transferred to Chishima Province

Districts
Hanasaki (花咲郡) (dissolved April 1, 1959 when Habomai Village was merged into Nemuro City; originally included Shikotan District)
Nemuro (根室郡) (dissolved August 1, 1957 when Nemuro Town and Wada Village merged to form Nemuro City)
Notsuke (野付郡)
Shibetsu (標津郡)
Menashi (目梨郡)

Notes

References
 Nussbaum, Louis-Frédéric and Käthe Roth. (2005).  Japan encyclopedia. Cambridge: Harvard University Press. ;  OCLC 58053128

Former provinces of Japan